"Moses supposes his toeses are roses" is a piece of English-language nonsense verse and a tongue-twister.

Lyrics
A version published in 1888 described as "causing much distress of mind to the habitue of Minnetonka", runs:

Moses supposes his toeses are roses;
Moses supposes erroneously,
For nobody's toeses are roses or posies,
As Moses supposes his toeses to be.

In 1895, a slightly different version was published:

If Moses supposes his toeses are roses,
Then Moses supposes erroneously;
For nobody's toeses are posies or roses,
As Moses supposes his toeses to be.

A variation from 1944 has:

Moses supposes his toeses are roses,
but Moses supposes erroneously.
For Moses he knowses his toeses aren't roses
as Moses supposes his toeses to be.

In 1952, this last version was used as the basis for the song with the same name in the musical comedy Singin' in the Rain, sung by the characters of Gene Kelly and Donald O'Connor during the diction lesson scene.

References

Tongue-twisters
Nonsense poetry
1952 songs
Patter songs
Songs with lyrics by Arthur Freed
Songs with music by Nacio Herb Brown
Gene Kelly songs
Quotations from film
MGM Records singles